Şehsuvar Hanım (1881 –  1945; meaning "intrepid hero") was the first wife of Abdulmejid II, the last Caliph of the Ottoman Caliphate.

Life
Of Turkish, or Ubykh origin, Şehsuvar Hanım was born in 1881. She married Abdulmejid, at the age of fifteen, on 22 December 1896. Şehzade Ömer Faruk, the couple's only son was born on 29 February 1898. 

Abdulmejid was interested in classical music. At times, he would perform with his wives, and the kalfas. He would be at the piano, Şehsuvar and Hayrünnisa Hanım would play the violin, and Mehisti Hanım the cello.

At the exile of the imperial family, in March 1924, she followed her husband, firstly to Switzerland and then to France where they settled in Paris. She could speak French, and could understand English.

In paintings

In an 1898 work by Abdulmejid, Pondering/Goethe in the harem, Şehsuvar is shown reclining on a settee. However, according to an interview with Fatma Neslişah Osmanoğlu on 26 May 2002, she said that the figure does not resemble her paternal grandmother Sehsuvar Hanım. In another work of 1915, Harmony of the Harem/Beethoven in the Harem, by her husband, she is shown playing a violin.

Death
She died in 1945, having outlived her husband by nearly one year, and was buried in the Muslim Bobigny cemetery in Paris.

Issue

References

Sources

1881 births
1945 deaths
20th-century Ottoman royalty